Satja Nai Chum Joan (Suea Sung Fah III); lit: Word in Bandit's Lair (The Tiger Commands the Heaven III)) is a Thai action/crime TV series aired on Thailand's Channel 7 HD from October 29, to December 4, 2022 on Fridays, Saturdays and Sundays at 20:30 for 17 episodes. It is the third and final installment in the Suea Sung Fah Trilogy, preceded by Suea Sung Fah (2011) and Suea Sung Fah II: Payak Payong (2013).

Plot
After the end of the Asia-Pacific War for many years, at Dong Phaya Yen, the gateway to the great Khao Yai, it appears that a masked bandit is rampant called Suea Dej. Suea Dej is a virtuous and truthful bandit. He often robs the rich who cheat or corrupt bureaucrats and distributes the looted assets to the poor villagers. He is therefore a favorite of the locals and has been dubbed "King of Dong Phaya Yen".

One day, a mysterious man, along with his sidekick, rescued a wounded woman named Auem Chan and Waeo Dao, the younger sister of Rachan, concealed form of Suea Dej. He is Han, Han, in fact, is a magic bandit known as Suea Han. Suea Dej has a grudge against Suea Han because he firmly believes that Suea Han was the cause of his parents' death. So he had to avenge.

Cast

Main
Akkaphan Namart as Rachan/ Suea Dej (Tiger Dej)
Chermawee Suwanpanuchoke as Jariya
Kelly Tanapat as Suea Han (Tiger Han)
Anna Glucks as Waeo Dao
Kiatipoom Banluechairit as Pol. Capt. Kokitat
Krittarit Butprom as Suea Khem

Supporting
Shahkrit Boonsing as Pol. Lt. Natee
Kanya Rattanapetch as Auem Chan
Chanapat Wonghrienthai as Suk
Somjit Jongjohor as Ja Dab (Sergeant Dab)
Supatpon Kasikam as Ram
Amarin Simarot as Pol. Col. Narit
Thapakorn Dissayanan as Inkarm
Kasab Champadib as Boonyoung
Vudhinan Maikan as Rueang
Wayne Falconer as Headman Kerd
Nuttanan Khunwat as Cherdchon
Farida Waller as Anchan
Jim Chuanchuen as Ja Kaew (Sergeant Kaew)
Silord Chernyim as Boonkuea
Suchada Poonpattanasuk as Kru Thong (Teacher Thong)

Special appearances
Chatmongkol Bumpen as Luang Rattana 
Ek Rangsiroj as Suea Mek (Tiger Mek)
Chartchai Ngamsan as Commander Yingyot
Tharathip Sihadejrungchai as Suea Tam (Tiger Tam)
John Bravo as Suea Lam (Tiger Lam)
Krailas Kraingkrai Luang Phu Boontha (Pastor Boontha)
Kittipan Bhumsuko as Commander Sura
Sitavasin Kabinchonlathit as Rachen

Production
Satja Nai Chum Joan (Suea Sung Fah III) is the third installment of the popular action drama TV series Suea Sung Fah (aka Legend of the Tiger) trilogy, preceded by Suea Sung Fah in 2011 and Suea Sung Fah II: Payak Payong in 2013, with the protagonist is Suea Han. The duration is 11 years from the first part and 9 years from the second part.

The series has the same performer who plays Suea Han, Kelly Tanapat, to play the same role. He said he loves this character. It was produced by the original production team, and the same director from the previous two installments, Anuwat Thanomrod.

Channel 7 HD, the copyright owner, has released a teaser and a trailer since the beginning of the year, even though it was broadcast at the end of the year. Before the broadcast, there was a sacrifice ceremony on October 10, 2022 at Ganesha courtyard, Channel 7 HD.

Because it is a completely unfinished filming series. There are still 80 percent remaining. Leading actor, Akkaphan Namart got sick suddenly. The production team then changed the leading actor to be Krittarit Butprom taking on the role of the protagonist instead at the end.

In addition, in episode 17 (finale), there are also main and supporting characters from Suea Sung Fah, the first part, appear to be seen, such as Suea Mek, Yingyot to end this trilogy series.

Ratings
In this table,  represent the lowest ratings and  represent the highest ratings.

References

External links
 
 

2022 Thai television series debuts
2022 Thai television series endings
Thai action television series
Fantasy television series
Television series set in the 1960s
Channel 7 (Thailand) original programming